Tarpey Village is a census-designated place in Fresno County, California, between Fresno and Clovis,  south of the latter, near Tarpey. Tarpey village falls within the Clovis Unified School District. At the 2010 census, the population was 3,888.

Demographics
At the 2010 census Tarpey Village had a population of 3,888. The racial makeup of Tarpey Village was 2,868 (73.8%) White, 77 (2.0%) African American, 59 (1.5%) Native American, 261 (6.7%) Asian, 3 (0.1%) Pacific Islander, 452 (11.6%) from other races, and 168 (4.3%) from two or more races. Hispanic or Latino of any race were 1,219 persons (31.4%).

The whole population lived in households, no one lived in non-institutionalized group quarters and no one was institutionalized.

There were 1,283 households, 473 (36.9%) had children under the age of 18 living in them, 679 (52.9%) were opposite-sex married couples living together, 187 (14.6%) had a female householder with no husband present, 116 (9.0%) had a male householder with no wife present.  There were 88 (6.9%) unmarried opposite-sex partnerships, and 8 (0.6%) same-sex married couples or partnerships. 234 households (18.2%) were one person and 123 (9.6%) had someone living alone who was 65 or older. The average household size was 3.03.  There were 982 families (76.5% of households); the average family size was 3.42.

The age distribution was 981 people (25.2%) under the age of 18, 377 people (9.7%) aged 18 to 24, 908 people (23.4%) aged 25 to 44, 1,004 people (25.8%) aged 45 to 64, and 618 people (15.9%) who were 65 or older.  The median age was 38.8 years. For every 100 females, there were 98.6 males.  For every 100 females age 18 and over, there were 96.8 males.

There were 1,356 housing units at an average density of ,of which 1,283 were occupied, 1,028 (80.1%) by the owners and 255 (19.9%) by renters.  The homeowner vacancy rate was 1.9%; the rental vacancy rate was 6.2%.  2,997 people (77.1% of the population) lived in owner-occupied housing units and 891 people (22.9%) lived in rental housing units.

References

Census-designated places in Fresno County, California
Census-designated places in California